Olmsted Falls High School is a public high school located in Olmsted Falls, Ohio, United States. The school colors are navy blue and gold, and the mascot is the Bulldog.  The school is a member of the Southwestern Conference.

Athletics and non-athletic achievements

Ohio High School Athletic Association State Championships
 Football - 2000 
 Girls' Cross Country - 1980, 1981, and 1987 
 Girls' Volleyball - 2008
 Girls' Pole Vault (Katie Nageotte) - 2009

Notable alumni
Mike Gansey (2001),  professional basketball player, current assistant general manager for the Cleveland Cavaliers
Steve Gansey (2004), basketball player and coach, current head coach of the Fort Wayne Mad Ants in the NBA G League
 Dan Monahan (1973), actor
 Katie Nageotte (2009), 2020 Summer Olympics Pole Vault Gold Medalist

References

External links
 District website

High schools in Cuyahoga County, Ohio
Public high schools in Ohio